The Honourable George Charles Grantley FitzHardinge Berkeley (10 February 1800 – 20 February 1881), known as Grantley Berkeley, was a British politician, writer and sportsman.

Background and education
Berkeley was the sixth son of Frederick Berkeley, 5th Earl of Berkeley, by Mary Cole, daughter of William Cole. He was the brother of William Berkeley, 1st Earl FitzHardinge, Maurice Berkeley, 1st Baron FitzHardinge, Henry FitzHardinge Berkeley, Thomas Berkeley, 6th Earl of Berkeley and Craven Berkeley and the nephew of Sir George Cranfield Berkeley. He was educated at Corpus Christi College and the Royal Military College, Sandhurst. He was commissioned into the Coldstream Guards and afterwards transferred to the 82nd Regiment of Foot.

Political career
Berkeley sat as member of parliament for Gloucestershire West from 1832 to 1852 as a Whig. In 1836 he proposed the admission of ladies to the gallery of the House of Commons; this was granted in 1841. After 1852 he devoted himself largely to field sports and writing.

Writings
Berkeley was the author of a number of books, including Berkeley Castle, Sandron Hall, or the Days of Queen Anne (1840), and My Life and Recollections, 4 volumes, (1865–66).

Duel
In 1836, Berkeley assaulted magazine publisher James Fraser over a review he published in Fraser's Magazine of  Berkeley Castle. He subsequently fought a duel with the review's author William Maginn. Three rounds of shots were fired, but no one was struck.

Family
Berkeley married Caroline Martha Benfield (1804–1873), daughter of Paul Benfield (1741–1810) and wife Mary Frances, née Swinburne (1771–1828), on 16 August 1824. Their two sons Swinburne and Edward died in 1865 and 1878 respectively. Berkeley died on 20 February 1881, aged 81.

References

Further reading
Oxford DNB index entry for Grantley Berkeley

External links
 

1800 births
1881 deaths
Younger sons of earls
Grantley
Graduates of the Royal Military College, Sandhurst
British duellists
Coldstream Guards officers
Members of the Parliament of the United Kingdom for Gloucestershire
Whig (British political party) MPs for English constituencies
UK MPs 1832–1835
UK MPs 1835–1837
UK MPs 1837–1841
UK MPs 1841–1847
UK MPs 1847–1852